Bowman is a village and municipality in the Outaouais region of Quebec, Canada.

Geography
The municipality is bordered to the east by the Du Lièvre River and by Whitefish Lake (lac du Poisson Blanc) in the north-west.

History
Bowman Township was formed in 1861 and named after one of the first inhabitants of this place, Baxter Bowman, who operated a sawmill at Dufferin Chutes in Buckingham and was owner of a large tract of forest in the Outaouais in the late nineteenth century.

On 1 January 1885, Bowman was combined with Villeneuve Township to form the United Township Municipality of Bowman-et-Villeneuve. In 1913, the Township Municipality of Bowman was formed when the two townships separated (Villeneuve was renamed to Val-des-Bois in 1958), and in 1954, its statutes were amended again to become the Municipality of Bowman.

Bowman was affected by the 2010 Central Canada earthquake and suffered some damage to a 50 metre wide area of land near a bridge.  Traffic on Route 307 was diverted while Transport Canada assessed the damage.  There were no fatalities.

Demographics

Mother tongue:
 English as first language: 9.8%
 French as first language: 88.6%
 English and French as first language: 0.8%
 Other as first language: 1.5%

Local government
List of former mayors:

 Roger Madore (2005–2009)
 Michel David (2009-2017)
 Pierre Labonté (2017–present)

References

Incorporated places in Outaouais
Municipalities in Quebec